Love Can't Wait may refer to:

Love Can't Wait (album), a 1991 album by Lil Suzy
Love Can't Wait (TV series), a 2006 television South Korean television series
"Love Can't Wait" (Nick Carter song), 2010